The Parti marxiste–léniniste du Québec fielded thirty candidates in the 1989 Quebec provincial election, none of whom were elected. Information about these candidates may be found on this page.

Candidates

Dorion: Francine Tremblay
Francine Tremblay ran for the Marxist-Leninist Party in four federal elections and two provincial elections.

Viger: Catherine Commandeur
Catherine Commandeur was a physician who specialized in environmental workplace health. Her name is listed on the Marxist-Leninist party's Ottawa memorial. Commandeur was presumably related to Caroline Commandeur-Laloux, who has also sought election as a Marxist-Leninist candidate in Montreal.

References

Candidates in Quebec provincial elections
Quebec 1989